Biffy may refer to:


People

Nickname
 Amyas Borton (1886–1969), British First World War pilot, air commander and air vice marshal
 Wilfred Dunderdale (1899–1990), British spy and intelligence officer
 Langdon Lea (1874–1937), American football player and coach
 Jay L. Lee (1887–1970), American football player and coach

Other people
 Count de Biffy, a chess player in the 1786 chess treatise Traité des Amateurs

Fictional characters
 Charles "Biffy" Biffen, the title character of "The Rummy Affair of Old Biffy", a P. G. Wodehouse short story
 Bifford T. "Biffy" Goldstein, a main character in Detentionaire, a Canadian animated series

Other uses
 Biffy Clyro, sometimes shortened to Biffy, a Scottish rock band
 Biffy, a 1920 play written by Vera Beringer and William Ray
 Blackpool Faith Forum for Youth (BIFFY), a Blackpool youth forum 

Lists of people by nickname